This article lists seasons played in the third tier of English football from 2004–05, when the Football League Division Two was renamed the Football League One.

Seasons

Notes